Adam Jan Puza (born 2 January 1951 in Szarejki) is a Polish politician. He was elected to Sejm on 25 September 2005, getting 5,213 votes in 35 Olsztyn district as a candidate from the Law and Justice list.

See also 
Members of Polish Sejm 2005-2007

External links 
Adam Puza - parliamentary page - includes declarations of interest, voting record, and transcripts of speeches.

Members of the Polish Sejm 2005–2007
Law and Justice politicians
1951 births
Living people
People from Ełk County